Katokhar is a small village in Ram Nagar Tehsil in Ambedkar Nagar District of Uttar Pradesh, India. It comes under Kasdaha Panchayath. It belongs to Faizabad Division. It is located 34 km towards east from District headquarters Akbarpur, Ambedkar Nagar. 20 km from Ram Nagar. 226 km from State capital Lucknow

References

Villages in Ambedkar Nagar district